Peter Wong may refer to:
 Peter Wong (banker) (born 1951), General Manager of HSBC Group and an executive director of Hong Kong and Shanghai Banking Corporation Limited
 Peter Wong (sports commentator) (born 1944), Hong Kong-based host of a number of sporting programmes
 Peter Wong (Australian politician) (born 1942), Australian politician, Unity Party member of the New South Wales Legislative Council
 Peter Wong (Canadian politician) (1931–1998), Canadian municipal politician in Sudbury, Ontario
 Peter C. Wong (1922–1989), member of the Executive Council and Legislative Council of Hong Kong
 Peter Wong Hong-yuen (born 1944), member of the Legislative Council of Hong Kong (1988–95)
 Peter Wong Man-kong (1949–2019), member of the National People's Congress from Hong Kong (1993–2019)